Typhoon Mary, also nicknamed "Bloody Mary" by the Joint Typhoon Warning Center (JTWC), was an extremely damaging storm that was part of the 1960 Pacific typhoon season. It began as a circulation in a trough in the South China Sea. A tropical depression formed on June 2, as it was traveling clockwise. It became a tropical storm on the next day, and received the name Mary. It slowly moved across the sea, strengthening to a typhoon. Mary made landfall in Hong Kong on June 8, and moved through Guangdong and Fujian. It reemerged back to the Pacific Ocean, and restrengthened into a typhoon temporarily.  It then traveled east, weakening and becoming extratropical on June 12.

Mary caused a significant amount of damage in Hong Kong and China. It was considered the worst storm to hit Hong Kong since the typhoon in 1937. The storm destroyed weak shacks made by refugees from the mainland, leaving thousands homeless. There were multiple landslides, and most of the infrastructure were damaged. More than 400 small watercraft were either damaged or destroyed. In China, dikes and dams were damaged severely, multiple public buildings collapsed, and destroyed large swaths of farmland. Significant wind and rain was also reported in Taiwan. More than 1,600 people died during the storm.

Meteorological history

In early June, a trough extended from Taiwan to the South China Sea, and a small circulation was found at the southwestern part of it. JTWC reported it had winds of  during that time. On the next day at 1200 UTC, JTWC began tracking the storm as a tropical depression.

Twelve hours later, the storm made landfall on Hong Kong northwest of Kowloon. The system gained speed as it traveled through Guangdong and Fujian provinces. Mary soon reemerged back to the ocean later than day, began restrengthening, and was found to have  winds, recorded by the U.S. Navy. The storm briefly became a typhoon at 1800 UTC, and reconnaissance aircraft recorded winds just above typhoon strength, although the circulation did not have eyewalls. It was downgraded to a tropical storm on June 11 at 1200 UTC.

Mary continued to weaken until June 12, when JTWC and JMA declared the storm had become extratropical southeast of Tokyo. JMA continued to track the extratropical cyclone until it reached the International Date Line on June 18.

Preparations, impact and aftermath

Before Mary made landfall, 80 freighters and liners arrived in Hong Kong to ride out the storm. In Okinawa, military personnel were evacuated to safe areas, and planes were all protected. Meanwhile, a joint military exercise by the South Korean and American Marines were delayed by one day due to the storm.

Hong Kong
Typhoon Mary was considered the worst storm to hit Hong Kong in 23 years. The typhoon arrived at the colony on June 8, dropping  of rain in 24 hours. At the Royal Observatory, the storm dropped  of rain. The No. 10 warning signal was issued by the Royal Observatory. Across the colony, damage to roads, buildings, and communication were significant. Landslides, and other fallen debris blocked roads, and weak refugee shacks in the hills, made out of tin and tar paper, quickly collapsed. All stores and public transportation were shut down inside the city. The Customs reported that more than 50 fishing vessels capsized and sank in the anchorages during the typhoon. Two ocean freighters, the Malaya Fir and the Wan Fu, ran aground onto the Kai Tak Airstrip. Although the floods have caused extreme damage, it helped with the local shortage of water, with reservoirs gaining  of water.

After the storm, 18,000 refugees from Mainland China became homeless. The official count was 45 casualties, 11 missing, and 127 injured, with most casualties coming from refugees. Overall, 462 small watercraft were damaged or destroyed.

Elsewhere
In Mainland China, the typhoon brought heavy rain and wind into the provinces of Guangdong and Fujian. Dikes and dams were severely damaged by the storm, leading to severe flooding. Thousands of people were trying to reinforce these as the floodwaters continued to rise. Manpower was also used to gather ripened crops before the storm destroyed them. The total number of casualties was reportedly 1,600; and 180,000 cattle were reported killed.

Macau received a similar amount of rain as Hong Kong, which caused local flooding. The winds uprooted trees, blocking local streets.

Fifty-four survivors were rescued and safely transported to the British colony by the Royal Navy frigate HMS Torquay, with help from Dutch ships, and the Republic of China Navy and Air Force.

Off the coast of Mainland China, in the Matsu Islands, many fishing boats were damaged by the heavy seas and the torrential rainfall. Three people were injured in the islands. In Taiwan, downtown Taipei received significant flooding, and some rice crops on the south part of the island were damaged. Although there were no reported deaths on the island, four fisherman offshore died.

Notes

References

Mary
Mary
Mary (1960)
Mary